Norm Nelson (January 30, 1923 – November 8, 1988) was an American stock car racer. He competed in the United States Auto Club (USAC) Stock Cars in the 1950s through 1970s. He won the season championship in 1960, 1965, and 1966 as a driver. Nelson also won five owner's championships. He competed in five NASCAR Grand National Series events and won one. He had 35 USAC victories including 11 at the Milwaukee Mile near his hometown Racine, Wisconsin. He was nicknamed "The Great Dane" because he was 6 feet 4 inches tall.

Racing career

Early career
Nelson prepared for racing when, as a 14-year-old, he borrowed his sister's 1934 Chevrolet and he raced it on the back streets of Racine. He competed for the first time on a rainy 1939 afternoon race in a swampy field near Pleasant Prairie. His first race ended when his jalopy got stuck on the straightaway. He continued in the car until the 1940-41 winter indoor series, when he got a ride in a midget car at the Chicago Amphitheater. He ended up driving the midget into the wall in the first corner. Racing in the United States ended for World War II and he served the United States Army. After the war ended, he returned to successfully race midget cars. He stopped racing midgets in favor of late model stock cars so he could race more frequently.

Nelso had been introduced to stock car racing in 1948 when Milwaukee promoter Tom Marchese brought stock cars to the region. Nelson said "Once I got into stock car racing, I knew that it was for me. I couldn't get into just any midget. We always had to make special ones for me." He raced in his first stock car race on the dirt of the Milwaukee Mile in 1948 and finished third in the  event.

USAC
In 1950, Nelson was racing the American Automobile Association (AAA) Stock Car division in its first season and was leading the national points going into the final race at the Springfield Mile. Second-place driver Jay Frank was the only driver who could catch him in the points and he had to win while Nelson had to not finish the race. "That's exactly what happened", Nelson said. "The engine on my Oldsmobile blew and he won the race." Earlier that season he lost all of his points earned for winning a race at Milwaukee after USAC determined he had used an illegal gear. He was using a special mountain gear in his Oldsmobile; he pointed out (to no avail) that the part can be found in a parts catalog. He continued to race in AAA Stock Car races in 1952, 1953, and 1954 - collecting top-five finishes at Toledo Raceway Park, Dayton Speedway, Illiana Speedway, and Milwaukee.

Nelson joined up with Carl Kiekhaefer's Chrysler team in 1955. He won a 1955 stock car race at the Milwaukee Mile and blew his right front tire right after winning the race causing the car to skid into the walls. Nelson's crew had done their pit stop in 1 minute and second-place finisher Marshall Teague had a 1-minute and 40 seconds stop. He raced at Wilmot Speedway in Kenosha in 1959 and won the track's modified stock class. He returned to driving on the national tour and finished third in 1958 and 1959. For the first time in his career, Nelson drove in someone else's car when Bill Trainor hired him to race. He won a race at the DuQuoin State Fairgrounds Racetrack and had several second-place finishes during his 1960 championship season. He added a win in the Midwest Association for Race Cars (MARC), the forerunner to ARCA in a race under dual sanction with USAC.

Beginning in 1963, Nelson hired Jerry Kulwicki (Alan Kulwicki's father) to build engines for his race cars. Nelson began his 25th season of racing in 1965 by winning the season-opening USAC Stock Car race at Milwaukee over Paul Goldsmith. Nelson took the lead away from Parnelli Jones when his engine blew up late in the race. Three NASCAR drivers competed in the event - Richard Petty, David Pearson, and Bobby Isaac.

Nelson won the Yankee 300 race at Indianapolis Raceway Park in 1965 which contributed toward him winning his second driver's championship that season. Nelson won the 150-mile event at Langhorne Speedway in 1966 and he won his third season championship. He also won his second straight Yankee 300 at IRP.

When Nelson retired from driving in 1976 because of detached retina, he was tied with A. J. Foyt for second on the all-time USAC victories list with 35 wins.

NASCAR
Nelson made five starts in his Grand National career. He made his first start at the 1955 LeHi 300 in LeHi, Arkansas and won his only NASCAR race later that season after starting on the pole position at the only NASCAR race held at the 1-mile dirt Las Vegas Park Speedway. While driving for Carl Kiekhaefer's championship team, he led the final 106 laps of a 111 lap race which was shortened from its original 200 lap distance because of darkness. He competed in three more NASCAR races, once each in 1966, 1967, and 1968.

Owner

Even before Nelson's career began to wind down, he began having other racers drive in his USAC car. He hired Roger McCluskey to drive for him in 1968, starting a two-car operation as Nelson began to wind down his career. In 1975, McCluskey had to miss a race because he had a burned foot; Nelson drove the car for him. Other drivers include A. J. Foyt.

Nelson's cars started in 13 NASCAR; nine of these races ended in a Top 10 finish. Jim Hurtubise drove Nelson's only win as a car owner at Atlanta International Raceway.

Personality
Nelson was known for saving his equipment until the latter stages of a race. Alan Kulwicki said, "I can remember guys like A. J. Foyt and Parnelli Jones drove against him, and Norm wasn't as much a charger as those guys, but he was always there at the end of a race. Because he owned his own cars, he didn't run them as hard as those other guys did." Kulwicki added, "He was a good, smooth driver and very intelligent."

Personal life
Nelson and his wife Caroline had eight children. He also had 15+ grandchildren. During the racing off-season, he owned a snowmobile sales and repair shop in Racine called "Nelson Enterprises". Caroline and several of their children worked at the shop.

Death
Nelson died on November 8, 1988 while at the Zablocki Veterans Administration Center at age 65 and he was buried at the Graceland Cemetery in Racine.

References

External links
 
 

NASCAR drivers
NASCAR team owners
Sportspeople from Racine, Wisconsin
1988 deaths
1923 births
Racing drivers from Wisconsin
United States Army personnel of World War II
USAC Stock Car drivers